Oreochrysum is a genus of flowering plants in the family Asteraceae.

Species
There is only one known species, Oreochrysum parryi, native to western North America (Chihuahua, New Mexico, Arizona, Nevada, Utah, Colorado, Wyoming, South Dakota). Parry's goldenrod is a common name for this species.

References

Astereae
Monotypic Asteraceae genera
Flora of North America